Baron Glenconner, of The Glen in the County of Peebles, is a title in the Peerage of the United Kingdom. It was created in 1911 for Sir Edward Tennant, 2nd Baronet, who had earlier represented Salisbury in the House of Commons as a Liberal and also served as Lord Lieutenant of Peeblesshire. Lord Glenconner was succeeded by his second son, the second baron. The latter was succeeded in 1983 by his eldest son, the third baron, who bought the island of Mustique. , the titles are held by the third baron's grandson, the fourth baron, who became the next-to-youngest peer in the realm when he succeeded in August 2010.

The Tennant baronetcy, of The Glen and St Rollox, was created in the Baronetage of the United Kingdom in 1885 for Charles Tennant, a businessman and Liberal Member of Parliament. He was the grandson of the chemist and industrialist Charles Tennant. Tennant was succeeded by his fourth son, the aforementioned second baronet, who was elevated to the peerage in 1911.

The seat of the baronetcy is Glen House, near Peebles, under the hill named Minchmuir.

Tennant baronets, of The Glen and St Rollox (1885)
Sir Charles Clow Tennant, 1st Baronet (1823–1906)
Sir Edward Priaulx Tennant, 2nd Baronet (1859–1920) (created Baron Glenconner in 1911)

Barons Glenconner (1911)
Edward Priaulx Tennant, 1st Baron Glenconner (1859–1920)
The Hon. Edward Wyndham Tennant (1897–1916), eldest son of the 1st Baron, killed in action in World War I, without issue.
Christopher Grey Tennant, 2nd Baron Glenconner (1899–1983), second son of the 1st Baron.
Colin Christopher Paget Tennant, 3rd Baron Glenconner (1926–2010), eldest son of the 2nd Baron.
The Hon. Charles Edward Pevensey Tennant (1957–1996), eldest son of the 3rd Baron.
Cody Charles Edward Tennant, 4th Baron Glenconner (born 1994), grandson of the 3rd Baron through the Hon. Charles Tennant.

The heir presumptive is the present holder's first cousin, Euan Lovell Tennant (born 1983), the son of Hon. Henry Lovell Tennant (1960–1990), second son of the 3rd Baron, and Teresa "Tessa" Tennant (née Cormack; 1959–2018).

Male-line family tree

Other notable family members
Several other members of the Tennant family have also gained distinction:
The Liberal politician Harold Tennant was a younger son of the first Baronet.
Margot Asquith (née Tennant), wife of Prime Minister H. H. Asquith, was the daughter of the first Baronet from his first marriage.
The civil servant and politician Katharine Elliot, Baroness Elliot of Harwood (née Tennant), was the daughter of the first Baronet from his second marriage.
The war poet Edward Tennant was the eldest son of the first Baron.
The Hon. Stephen Tennant and the Hon. David Tennant were younger sons of the first Baron.
The author Emma Tennant was the daughter of the second Baron.
The model Stella Tennant was the daughter of the Hon. Tobias William Tennant, younger son of the second Baron, by Lady Emma Tennant (née Cavendish), daughter of the 11th Duke of Devonshire (not to be confused with the author Emma Tennant mentioned above).

References

Book sources

Kidd, Charles, Williamson, David (editors). Debrett's Peerage and Baronetage (1990 edition). New York: St Martin's Press, 1990, 

Baronies in the Peerage of the United Kingdom
Noble titles created in 1911
Noble titles created for UK MPs